Club Ciudad de Buenos Aires, familiarly nicknamed as "Muni", is an Argentine sports and social club located in the Núñez district of the city of Buenos Aires. The institution was founded on October 6, 1920.

The nickname "Muni" is a diminutive of the word "Municipalidad", which was the way the Government of Buenos Aires seat was called until the 1994 reform of the Argentine Constitution. Since then, the Executive is called "Jefe de Gobierno" ("Chief of Government") instead of "Intendente" ("Mayor") and the former "Municipalidad" denomination became obsolete.

History

On 6 October 1920 employees of the Municipality of Buenos Aires met to found a club which was initially named "Club Atlético Dirección de Alumbrado". After that, they began the search for a field to practice sports.

One year later, the Government of Buenos Aires gave the club a 100 m2 land over Blandengues street (current Del Libertador Avenue) where the club established its headquarters.

Activities 
Ciudad hosts a large number of sports and activities, such as artistic gymnastics, artistic roller skating, basketball, basque pelota, cestoball, field hockey, football, golf, judo, karate, roller hockey, rugby union, rhythmic gymnastics, softball, swimming, synchronised swimming, taekwondo, tennis, volleyball, among others. Other recreational activities include latin and pop dance, pilates and yoga among others.

Field hockey is the most representative sport of the club, with competitive teams in both men's and women's divisions. The hockey squads currently play at Metropolitano de Primera División, the top division of Argentine hockey league system.

Although the institution had been founded in 1920, the rugby union team was not formed until 1938. The same year the team was affiliated to the Argentine Rugby Union, taking part in the "Competencia" tournament. The rugby union team is currently member of the Unión de Rugby de Buenos Aires (URBA) playing in Primera División B, the second division of Union's league system.

In 1972 the team promoted to the second division, with 486 points scored and only 99 conceded. The top scorer was Emilio "Cachavacha" Aliaga, team's fullback. A years later Ciudad would be dissolved but was formed again in 1983, with some of the former 1972 players and many other from the youth categories taking part of the team.

In 1986 the top division of Club Ciudad was the "Torneo de Ascenso" sub-champion. In 1994 the team was relegated to lower category but promoted in 1997 after a restructuring of the tournaments by the Argentine Rugby Union.

Honours

Field hockey
Men's
 Metropolitano Primera División (14): 1976, 1977, 1979, 1981, 1984, 1985, 1986, 1987, 1988, 1990, 1991, 1997, 1999, 2014
Women's
 Metropolitano Primera División (5): 1998, 1999, 2000, 2004, 2014

Concerts
Club Ciudad has held many concerts since 2008 to date, as part of the Pepsi Music Festival that takes part in Buenos Aires. Some of the artists that performed there are:

Radiohead
Faith No More
Pet Shop Boys
Zero 7
Tahiti 80
Gogol Bordello
Maxïmo Park
The Ting Tings
Calle 13
Kraftwerk
Keane
Jesus & Mary Chain
Stone Temple Pilots
Depeche Mode

The Offspring
R.E.M.
Kaiser Chiefs
The Mars Volta
The Black Eyed Peas
New Order
Madness
Ian Brown
The Rasmus
The Bravery
The Dandy Warhols
Snoop Dogg
Beastie Boys
Daft Punk

Patti Smith
Yeah Yeah Yeahs
Mötley Crüe
TV on the Radio
The Strokes
Kings of Leon
M.I.A.
Elvis Costello
Massive Attack
rinôçérôse
The Slackers
The Human League

References

External links

 

c
Argentine roller hockey clubs
Rugby union clubs in Buenos Aires
Rugby clubs established in 1920
Field hockey clubs established in 1920
Sports clubs established in 1920
1920 establishments in Argentina
C